The Noric language, or Eastern Celtic, is an unclassified Continental Celtic language. It is attested in only two fragmentary inscriptions from the Roman province of Noricum (one in Grafenstein, Austria, the other in Ptuj, Slovenia). These do not provide enough information to draw conclusions about the language. However, it was probably similar to other Celtic languages near to it, such as Gaulish. No evidence yet shows when it became extinct.

Ptuj inscription 

The Ptuj inscription, discovered in 1894, is written right to left in a northern Italic alphabet and reads:

This is interpreted as two personal names: Artebudz [son] of Brogduos. The name Artebudz may mean "bear penis" (compare Welsh  "bear" and Irish  "penis"), while Brogduos may contain the element brog-, mrog- "country" (compare Welsh  "region, country"). Alternatively, the inscription may be interpreted as Artebudz [made this] for Brogdos, with the second name in the dative case.

Grafenstein inscription 

The Grafenstein inscription, on a tile from the 2nd century AD that was discovered in a gravel pit in 1977, is incomplete, but the extant part has been transcribed as follows:

Here, Moge seems to be a personal name or an abbreviation of one, P· II- lav a Latin abbreviation indicating a weight, ne sadiíes a verbal form possibly meaning "you (singular) do not set", ollo so perhaps "this amount", and Lugnu another personal name. The text may therefore be a record of some sort of financial transaction.

Other readings of the inscription have also been proposed, including:

and

References 

Continental Celtic languages
Extinct Celtic languages
Languages of Austria
Languages of Slovenia
Extinct languages of Europe
Languages attested from the 2nd century